Stanborough School is a secondary academy school located in Welwyn Garden City, Hertfordshire, England.

Like most secondary schools, it has a sixth form. It is situated off Stanborough Road (A6129), near the A1(M), and across the road from the headquarters of Hertfordshire Constabulary, a golf driving range and the Gosling Sports Park (with an athletics track and ski slope). The East Coast Main Line is about 1 km away.

History

Grammar school
It was founded as a selective Grammar school in 1939, and so recently celebrated its 70th year. It had around 550 girls and boys in the 1960s.

Comprehensive
It became an all-ability comprehensive school in 1968. In the early 1980s it had around 900 boys and girls.

Merger with Sir John Newsom School
In September 1998, nearby Sir John Newsom School was merged with Stanborough School and its pupils transferred across to Stanborough site.

Academy status
The school gained academy status in February 2012 with a specialism in Maths and Computing. The school is now independent of local authority control and legally is a private company limited by guarantee registered at Companies House with registration number 07900439.

Notable school events

Run
Run for Stanborough: Usually taken place during October, members of Stanborough School – students, teachers and support staff will walk or run their way around Stanborough Lakes to raise money for the school charity. In 2011, £6000 was raised for Teenage Cancer Trust from this one single event,  and the 2012/13 charity will be 'Rays of Sunshine', for who the school aims to raise as much money for. Some will be in fancy dress, and the runners will be in PE kit, but everyone will have the same purpose – to get as much sponsorship as possible to help worthy causes. The Run also contributes as one of the events during the School year which contributes to the House Cup.

The event usually ends with the eagerly awaited gunging, where students get to see their teachers at the end of the run be gunged with as variety of sloppy concoctions tipped over their heads.

Drama
House Drama: Performed shortly before Christmas, House Captains arrange a house production at the beginning of school term which is rehearsed over the months ready for the big event. The cast consists only of house members and is directed and produced solely by the House captains. Each House performance can only be 30 minutes long. This event contributes to the Stanborough House Trophy, but winners of this competition also win a House Drama Trophy.
2008 saw Ashridge win with their performance of Beauty and the Beast, 2nd place was given to Hatfield with their performance of "A Streetcar Named Desire"

School Productions: Every other year, the Drama department (and sometimes the music department) and school members host a school production, performed in the Spring term, rehearsals starting in September. Past performances have been the likes of Oliver, West Side Story, We Will Rock You and most recently Les Misérables.

Music
House Music: Performed in the spring term. Musicians of each house demonstrate a wide range of musical genius by hosting a 30-minute performance full of a variety of musical acts, which since 2012 are now put on after school giving parents a chance to buy tickets and watch the event. Performances in the past have been known to include rock bands, singing, instrument solos, musical numbers and rapping.

Dance
School Dance Display: Every other Year after the school production, the Dance department and students perform a spectacular series of dance numbers, demonstrating unique and creative talents.

Sixth Form Consortium 
Stanborough Sixth form is part of a wider consortium of many secondary schools in the area. Stanborough offers a range of subjects at A level on site. English, History, Mathematics, Science, Computer Science, Psychology are just a few examples. Other schools aligned with the sixth form consortium include:
 Monk's Walk School
 Ridgeway Academy
 Bishop's Hatfield Girls' School
 Onslow St Audrey's School

Academic performance
Stanborough School often achieves GCSE results above the national average, with 51% of pupils achieving the equivalent of five or more GCSEs grade C or above including English and Maths in 2012.  Their A Level results are consistently one of the highest of maintained schools in Hertfordshire.

Notable former pupils

Welwyn Garden City Stanborough Grammar School
 Prof Roger Heath-Brown, Professor of Pure Mathematics since 1999 at the University of Oxford
 Michael Peacock OBE, television executive, Controller of BBC1 from 1965–7, and chairman from 1989 to 1995 of UBC Media Group
 Prof Michael Talbot, James and Constance Alsop Professor of Music from 1986 to 2003 at the University of Liverpool
 Glyn Maxwell, poet
 Prof. Jonathan Gregory, Professor of Climate Change and Modelling at the University of Reading and the Met Office.
 Klaus Hasselmann, 2021 Nobel Laureate in Physics

References

External links
 

Secondary schools in Hertfordshire
Schools in Welwyn Garden City
Educational institutions established in 1939
1939 establishments in England
Academies in Hertfordshire